The Riot Act 1549 (3&4 Edw.6 c.5) was an Act of the Parliament of England. It made it high treason for 12 people or more to assemble and attempt to kill or imprison any member of the King's council or change the laws, and refuse to disperse when ordered to do so by a justice of the peace, mayor or sheriff.  This offence was abolished by the Treason Act 1553, but another Act of that year, 1 Mar. Stat.2 c.12, recreated it, but this time as a felony.

The 1549 Act also made it a felony for 12 or more people rioting for various other purposes to refuse to disperse for an hour after being ordered to do so.

See also
 High treason in the United Kingdom
 Treason Act

References

Acts of the Parliament of England (1485–1603)
1549 in law
Treason in England
1549 in England